Bajram Fetai (born 7 September 1985) is a Macedonian football coach, former player, and actor. He is of Albanian ethnicity.

Club career
He spent the early part of his career in Scotland, where he was a youth player at Rangers. At Rangers he made one first team appearance against Dunfermline in March 2004. The following season he had a loan spell at Inverness Caledonian Thistle before leaving Rangers for Silkeborg in 2005.

In 2010, he gained infamy after his "violent goal celebration" scoring for FC Nordsjælland against his old club Silkeborg, was widely distributed on the internet.

Fetai retired from football after his contract with FC Roskilde was terminated on 1 September 2016.

International career
He made his senior debut for Macedonia in a November 2010 friendly match against Albania and has earned a total of four caps, scoring no goals. His final international was a June 2013 friendly against Sweden.

Coaching career
In January 2017, Fetai was appointed coach in FC Nordsjælland's academy responsible for integration across levels. He held multiple positions in the Nordsjælland organisation, but left in January 2022 to focus on a café he owned in Copenhagen.

Acting career
Fetai made his acting debut in 2022, after being cast in the role as Flori in Nicolas Winding Refn's television series Copenhagen Cowboy.

Filmography

Television

References

External links

 
 
 
 Bajram Fetai at Macedonian Football
 Bajram Fetai at DanskFodbold.com
 

1985 births
Living people
Sportspeople from Tetovo
Danish people of Albanian descent
Danish people of Macedonian descent
Albanian footballers from North Macedonia
Association football forwards
Macedonian footballers
North Macedonia international footballers
Danish men's footballers
Denmark youth international footballers
Boldklubben af 1893 players
Rangers F.C. players
Inverness Caledonian Thistle F.C. players
Silkeborg IF players
FC Nordsjælland players
Lyngby Boldklub players
Denizlispor footballers
FC Roskilde players
Danish Superliga players
Danish 1st Division players
Scottish Premier League players
Danish expatriate men's footballers
Macedonian expatriate footballers
Expatriate footballers in Scotland
Danish expatriate sportspeople in Scotland
Macedonian expatriate sportspeople in Scotland
Expatriate footballers in Turkey
Danish expatriate sportspeople in Turkey
Macedonian expatriate sportspeople in Turkey
Association football coaches
FC Nordsjælland non-playing staff
Danish male television actors
Macedonian male television actors